Corrupted Oil - Jerry, also called Crude Oil Jerry, is an artwork by graffiti artist Banksy, using stencil of a cartoon mouse character Jerry on an oil painting.

It was valued by English antiques expert and television presenter Jonty Hearnden at £150,000 in 2014, which was a rise in value of 30 times what the owner originally paid.

Exhibitions 
The work was first seen in one of Banksy's first major exhibition Turf War in 2003. It has been displayed in the Moco Museum of Amsterdam since 2016.

References 

2003 works
Mice and rats in art
Works by Banksy